Annesorhiza is a genus of flowering plant in the Apiaceae, with about 12 to 15 species. It is endemic to southern Africa. Various species of the genus are noted for their content of aroma compounds  and have a traditional culinary usage. Some species are notable for their content of phenylpropene derivatives such as nothoapiole.

References 

Apioideae